In computational algebra, the Cantor–Zassenhaus algorithm is a method for factoring polynomials over finite fields (also called Galois fields).

The algorithm consists mainly of exponentiation and polynomial GCD computations. It was invented by David G. Cantor and Hans Zassenhaus in 1981.

It is arguably the dominant algorithm for solving the problem, having replaced the earlier Berlekamp's algorithm of 1967. It is currently implemented in many computer algebra systems.

Overview

Background
It gives as output a polynomial  with coefficients in the same field such that  divides . The algorithm may then be applied recursively to these and subsequent divisors, until we find the decomposition of  into powers of irreducible polynomials (recalling that the ring of polynomials over any field is a unique factorisation domain).

. If we suppose that  has irreducible factors , all of degree d, then this factor ring is isomorphic to the direct product of factor rings .

 

then . These fields each have degree .

Core result
The core result underlying the Cantor–Zassenhaus algorithm is the following:  If  is a polynomial satisfying:

 

 

where  is the reduction of  modulo  as before, and if any two of the following three sets is non-empty:

 

 

 

then there exist the following non-trivial factors of :

Algorithm
It proceeds as follows, in the case where the field  is of odd-characteristic (the process can be generalised to characteristic 2 fields in a fairly straightforward way ). Select a random polynomial  such that . Set  and compute . Since  is an isomorphism, we have (using our now-established notation):

Now, each  is an element of a field of order , as noted earlier. The multiplicative subgroup of this field has order  and so, unless , we have  for each i and hence  for each i. If , then of course . Further, since , at least two of the sets  and C are non-empty and by computing the above GCDs we may obtain non-trivial factors. Since the ring of polynomials over a field is a Euclidean domain, we may compute these GCDs using the Euclidean algorithm.

Applications
One important application of the Cantor–Zassenhaus algorithm is in computing discrete logarithms over finite fields of prime-power order.  Computing discrete logarithms is an important problem in public key cryptography.  For a field of prime-power order, the fastest known method is the index calculus method, which involves the factorisation of field elements.  If we represent the prime-power order field in the usual way – that is, as polynomials over the prime order base field, reduced modulo an irreducible polynomial of appropriate degree – then this is simply polynomial factorisation, as provided by the Cantor–Zassenhaus algorithm.

Implementation in computer algebra systems
The Cantor–Zassenhaus algorithm is implemented in the PARI/GP computer algebra system as the factorcantor() function.

See also
Polynomial factorization
Factorization of polynomials over finite fields

References

http://blog.fkraiem.org/2013/12/01/polynomial-factorisation-over-finite-fields-part-3-final-splitting-cantor-zassenhaus-in-odd-characteristic/

Computer algebra
Finite fields
Polynomials factorization algorithms